HM Golam Reza is a Jatiya Party (Ershad) politician and the former Member of Parliament of Satkhira-4.

Career
Reza was elected to parliament from Satkhira-4 as a Jatiya Party candidate in 2008. He was expelled from Jatiya Party following a dispute with party president, Hussain Muhammad Ershad.

References

Living people
People from Satkhira District
Jatiya Party politicians
9th Jatiya Sangsad members
Year of birth missing (living people)